Vegas del Condado, Vegas del Condáu, in Leonese language, is a municipality located in the province of León, Castile and León, Spain. According to the 2004 census (INE), the municipality has a population of 1,361 inhabitants.

See also
 Leonese language
 Kingdom of León

References

Municipalities in the Province of León